Belus was a legendary king of Tyre in Virgil's Aeneid and other Latin works. He was said to have been the father of Dido of Carthage, Pygmalion of Tyre, and Anna.

See also
 Other people and places named Belus
 King of Tyre, list of historical kings of Tyre
 Melqart, Baal of Tyre

References

820s BC deaths
Phoenician characters in the Aeneid
Year of birth unknown